The KDZ1 is the first electrical multiple unit built in China. It is an experimental alternating current electrical multiple unit, developed by Changchun Railway Vehicles, CRRC Zhuzhou Institute and China Academy of Railway Sciences in 1978 and completed in 1988, though it never saw passenger service, with it being stored after it completed its initial tests.

Development 
At the end of the 1970s, research had somewhat restarted after the interruption caused by the cultural revolution, with it restarted by the March 1978 National Science Congress. In accordance to the ten-year plan for railway science and technology development created by the Ministry of Railways, Changchun Railway Vehicles, CRRC Zhuzhou Institute and China Academy of Railway Sciences cooperated to create an electric multiple unit, to fulfil the needs for high-speed intercity transport, and strengthen passenger transport capacity.

In 1983, the research on the electric multiple unit was coming close to being complete, and the train entered initial production. On 8 August 1989, the Premier, Li Peng and various other officials visited the Beijing ring railway, and had a test ride on the KDZ1, amongst other new railway carriages.

After completing the tests, KDZ1 was planned to be transferred to Zhengzhou bureau, Baoji sector and to be used on the Longhai railway between Xian and Baoji, but due to technical reasons and the lack of preparation, this was not achieved. The train was instead transferred back to Changchun Railway Vehicles, where it has been stored since. Although it never entered service, it provided experience in development of electric multiple units, which would be used in the following KDZ1A.

Technical specification

Overall structure 
The KDZ1 is a four car multiple unit, with two driving trailers on either end and two motor cars in the middle. A pair of driving trailer and a motor forms a traction unit, and the train can be controlled from either end. The roof of the driving trailer is fitted with a pantograph and the circuit breakers; the bottom of the car carries the primary transformers, Gate turn-off thyristor and other various electrical control equipment; the motor cars carry the smoothing reactors, static converters and the auxiliary electrical cabinet. The roof of the motor carries the resistors for dynamic braking. Carriages are mainly built of aluminium alloys and various other weight saving materials and the carriages are connected with tightlock coupers. All four carriages were hard seat cars in a two by three layout, with the driving carriages having a lower capacity at 88 people, compared to 103 in the motor cars.

Set composition

See also 

 Dongfeng DMU - first generation DMU
 Juche-class EMU - first generation EMU developed in similar era and with similar maximum speed

References 

Electric multiple units of China
Changchun Railway Vehicles
CRRC multiple units